Capital I is a 2015 Odia language independent feature film written and directed by Amartya Bhattacharyya. This film, tagged as an existential psychodrama, is the first independent feature film of Odisha. The film is produced by Susant Misra and Swastik Choudhury. This film is shot on a shoe-string budget without any film industry involvement. This film marks the feature film debut of Amartya Bhattacharyya as a writer, director, cinematographer and editor.  All actors in this film are non-professional actors, and all of them make their feature film debut in ‘Capital I'. Kisaloy Roy makes his debut as a music director, and so does Amrita Chowdhury as a Choreographer.

Capital I was premiered at Festival du Film d'Asie du Sud Transgressif (South Asian Alternative Film Festival) at Paris in February 2015. Thereafter, the film was screened at various film festivals including 20th International Film Festival of Kerala in December 2015. Capital I is distributed worldwide through the Italian sales and distribution company The Open Reel. Capital I is the first Indian film to be acquired by The Open Reel. In India, the film has been theatrically released in multiplexes (INOX and Cinépolis). The film's initial release dates are 23 October 2016 for Bhubaneswar, 6 November 2016 for Kolkata and 4 December 2016 for Mumbai.

Capital I is also the first ever Odia film to be released on Amazon Prime. In 2017, the film released on Amazon Prime in English speaking territories like USA, UK, Australia, Canada etc.

Plot 

"Living and ceasing to live are two imaginary solutions; existence is elsewhere" – Andre Breton's non-deterministic approach towards existentialism in The first Surreal Manifesto is brought out through a fiction, which has been categorized into a new genre – Existential Psychodrama !

Capital I is a fictitious character having its root in reality. There was an old house which was locked from inside with all windows closed, and when the police broke open the door, they found no one, neither any living person, nor a dead body. They only found few papers lying, with some abstract phrases and pictures with the signature below reading 'Capital I'. Police found the case unworthy of further investigations, as it doesn't affect anyone. They close the case.
But media spreads the rumor about the mysterious character and creates a buzz in the town. A young girl, pursuing MSC Psychology gets involved with her old Physics professor to research about Capital I. They research on the name, the phrases and the pictures and wrack their brain through a lot of intellectual thoughts. They eventually start transforming themselves psychologically. The girl, who wasn't satisfied with her submissive boyfriend living in Delhi, gets into a state of deep trance and starts hallucinating. Under extreme stress of the research, she loses her conscious control. The professor, also into a trance, couldn't break away, and the film suggestively ventures into the inevitable.

The film breaks away from realistic continuity and ventures into the surreal sphere. Scenes move randomly, just like a wandering mind having its root in reality. The film ends with an abstract culmination. Existence meanders through reality and imagination and ventures into a time-independent eternity. Moments tear apart and the debris of thoughts is periodically washed out, through the menstrual cycle of our minds. And the mind gets ready, yet again, for a new conception.

Cast 

 Pallavi Priyadarshini   as  Piyali
 Susant Misra  as Professor Misra
 Ipsita Mohanty  as  Pooja
 Ashutosh Panda as Farmer/Mime- artist

Independent production 

‘Capital I'

 was made with a DSLR camera (Canon 550D) and a still-photography tripod. The film is shot with a team size of less than five people including the cast, and can operationally be considered a guerrilla film. The film is not registered under any established commercial banner, and is produced independently by Susant Misra and Swastik Choudhury, who also make their debut as producers. The film is independent of any industry influence in its performance, conception, or in its operation. It is a completely independent (non-industry) film, and the first independent film made in the state of Odisha.

The film is not just independent of industry talents, but also independent of any resources. There were no trolleys, no cranes, no steady-cams, no artificial lights (except a 100watt bulb and small rice lights used in festivals), no technicians, no spot boys, no reflectors, no cutters, no industry gadgets or any conventional equipment used whatsoever. Even the lenses used were ordinary 18-55mm (f4-5.6) and 50mm (f1.8) lens. The complete post production, from editing to colour correction, sound design to sound mixing, was done in a home desktop. There was no use of any professional studio for conventional post-production services.

Critical acclaim 

The film, with its limited exposure, earned a lot of critical acclaim from different corners of the world. The film was received with a lot of attention at its premiere at ‘Festival du Film d'Asie du Sud Transgressif' (South Asian Alternative Film Festival), Paris, France in February 2015 where it was one of the six films in competition. Amartya Bhattacharyya was listed by an editor of ‘FantastikIndia' as one of the two most impactful Indian film personalities of 2015 in ‘Les Fanta d'Or 2015'.

The film was reviewed by many film critics and considered to be a bold film coming out of India. Richard Propes of ‘The Independent Critic' writes "It's the kind of film where you just sit there thinking to yourself - How has this film not been discovered?" He further writes - "Capital I is stellar a case of a talented writer/filmmaker with a clarity of vision and an ability to communicate that vision to his cast and crew in such a way that the talent involved far transcends the film's meager budget. The film is visually appealing, narratively involving and thought-provoking, and nicely constructed by cast and crew." Shirley Rodriguez of ‘Independent Film Now' writes "The gift of Capital I is the space it leaves for the audience to think for themselves. Relax and go for the ride." Film critic Misty Layne of Rogue Cinema expresses "Capital I is one of those films where every sentence spoken has meaning."  She goes on to say - "Seriously, this is a Must Watch, particularly if surrealism is your thing. I think this may be my first Indian film (Bollywood has never quite appealed) but if this is what's coming out of India right now, I am SO there."

Independent critic 'Vivek' of ‘Films that Matter' writes - "10 years from now, this film would be remade and probably then the original would be looked upon. There hasn't been a cinematic piece in a long time which was driven solely by such individualistic expression."

Film Festival journey

References

External links
 

2015 films
2010s Odia-language films